Emotions is the debut studio album by Swedish singer and songwriter Felix Sandman. It was released on 14 September 2018 by TEN Music Group and Artist House and peaked at number 3 on the Swedish charts.

Track listing
All song titles stylized in capital letters.

Charts

Weekly charts

Year-end charts

References

2018 debut albums
TEN Music Group albums
Pop albums by Swedish artists